HMS H31 was a British H class submarine built by Vickers Limited, Barrow-in-Furness. She was laid down on 19 April 1917 and was commissioned on 21 February 1919.

HMS H31 survived until World War II. During the operation, H31 was sunk by unknown causes, but most believe she was mined in the Bay of Biscay on 24 December 1941.

Design

H31 was fitted with an anti-aircraft gun and four  torpedo tubes. Its torpedo tubes were fitted to the bows and the submarine was loaded with eight  torpedoes. It is a Holland 602 type submarine but was designed to meet Royal Navy specifications. Its complement was twenty-two crew members.

See also
 List of submarines of the Second World War

References

Bibliography
 

 

British H-class submarines
Ships built in Barrow-in-Furness
1918 ships
World War I submarines of the United Kingdom
World War II submarines of the United Kingdom
Lost submarines of the United Kingdom
World War II shipwrecks in the Atlantic Ocean
Royal Navy ship names
Maritime incidents in December 1940
Maritime incidents in December 1941
Ships sunk by mines